Woodrow is an unincorporated community in Oak Lawn Township, Crow Wing County, Minnesota, United States, near Brainerd. It is along Woodrow Road near Dullum Road.

Woodrow was platted in 1914, and named for Woodrow Wilson, 28th president of the United States. A post office was established at Woodrow in 1915, and remained in operation until 1931.

References

Unincorporated communities in Crow Wing County, Minnesota
Unincorporated communities in Minnesota